The Galves–Löcherbach model (or GL model) is a mathematical model for a network of neurons with intrinsic stochasticity.

In the most general definition, a GL network consists of a countable number of elements (idealized neurons) that interact by sporadic nearly-instantaneous discrete events (spikes or firings).  At each moment, each neuron N fires independently, with a probability that depends on the history of the firings of all neurons since the last time N last fired.  Thus each neuron "forgets" all previous spikes, including its own, whenever it fires.  This property is a defining feature of the GL model.

In specific versions of the GL model, the past network spike history since the last firing of a neuron N may be summarized by an internal variable, the potential of that neuron, that is a weighted sum of those spikes.  The potential may include the spikes of only a finite subset of other neurons, thus modeling arbitrary synapse topologies.  In particular, the GL model includes as a special case the general leaky integrate-and-fire neuron model.

Formal definition 

The GL model has been formalized in several different ways. The notations below are borrowed from several of those sources.

The GL network model consists of a countable set of neurons with some set  of indices. The state  is defined only at discrete sampling times, represented by integers, with some fixed time step .  For simplicity, let's assume that these times extend to infinity in both directions, implying that the network has existed since forever.

In the GL model, all neurons are assumed evolve synchronously and atomically between successive sampling times. In particular, within each time step, each neuron may fire at most once.

Let  denote the matrix whose rows are the histories of all neuron firings from time  to time   inclusive, that is

and let  be defined similarly, but extending infinitely in the past.  Let  be the time before the last firing of neuron  before time , that is
  
Then the general GL model says that

Moreover, the firings in the same time step are conditionally independent, given the past network history, with the above probabilities.  That is, for each finite subset  and any configuration  we have

Potential-based variants

In a common special case of the GL model, the part of the past firing history  that is relevant to each neuron  at each sampling time  is summarized by a real-valued internal state variable or potential  (that corresponds to the membrane potential of a biological neuron), and is basically a weighted sum of the past spike indicators, since the last firing of neuron . That is,

In this formula,  is a numeric weight, that corresponds to the total weight or strength of the synapses from the axon of neuron  to the dentrites of neuron . The factor  is a history weight function that modulates the contributions of firings that happened  whole steps after the last firing of neuron  and  whole steps before the current time.

Then one defines

where  is a monotonically non-decreasing function from  into the interval .

If the synaptic weight  is negative, each firing of neuron  causes the potential  to decrease.  This is the way inhibitory synapses are approximated in the GL model.  The absence of a synapse between those two neurons is modeled by setting .

Leaky integrate and fire variants

In an even more specific case of the GL model, the potential  is defined to be a decaying weighted sum of the firings of other neurons.  Namely, when a neuron  fires, its potential is reset to zero. Until its next firing, a spike from any neuron  increments  by the constant amount .  Apart from those contributions, during each time step, the potential decays by a fixed recharge factor  towards zero.

In this variant, the evolution of the potential  can be expressed by a recurrence formula

Or, more compactly,

This special case results from taking the history weight factor  of the general potential-based variant to be .  It is very similar to the leaky integrate and fire model.

Reset potential
This self-weight therefore represents the reset potential that the neuron assumes just after firing, apart from other contributions. The potential evolution formula therefore can be written also as 

where  is the reset potential. Or, more compactly,

Resting potential
These formulas imply that the potential decays towards zero with time, when there are no external or synaptic inputs and the neuron itself does not fire.  Under these conditions, the membrane potential of a biological neuron will tend towards some negative value, the resting or baseline potential , on the order of −40 to −80 millivolts.

However, this apparent discrepancy exists only because it is customary in neurobiology to measure electric potentials relative to that of the extracellular medium.  That discrepancy disappears if one chooses the baseline potential  of the neuron as the reference for potential measurements.  Since the potential  has no influence outside of the neuron, its zero level can be chosen independently for each neuron.

Variant with refractory period
Some authors use a slightly different refractory variant of the integrate-and-fire GL neuron, which ignores all external and synaptic inputs (except possibly the self-synapse ) during the time step immediately after its own firing.  The equation for this variant is

or, more compactly,

Forgetful variants
Even more specific sub-variants of the integrate-and-fire GL neuron are obtained by setting the recharge factor  to zero.  In the resulting neuron model, the potential  (and hence the firing probability) depends only on the inputs in the previous time step; all earlier firings of the network, including of the same neuron, are ignored.  That is, the neuron does not have any internal state, and is essentially a (stochastic) function block.

The evolution equations then simplify to 

for the variant without refractory step, and

for the variant with refractory step.

In these sub-variants, while the individual neurons do not store any information from one step to the next, the network as a whole still can have persistent memory because of the implicit one-step delay between the synaptic inputs and the resulting firing of the neuron.

Writer::Mokone William kgotso

History 

The GL model was defined in 2013 by mathematicians Antonio Galves and Eva Löcherbach.  Its inspirations included Frank Spitzer's interacting particle system and Jorma Rissanen's notion of stochastic chain with memory of variable length. Another work that influenced this model was Bruno Cessac's study on the leaky integrate-and-fire model, who himself was influenced by Hédi Soula. Galves and Löcherbach referred to the process that Cessac described as "a version in a finite dimension" of their own probabilistic model.

Prior integrate-and-fire models with stochastic characteristics relied on including a noise to simulate stochasticity. The Galves–Löcherbach model distinguishes itself because it is inherently stochastic, incorporating probabilistic measures directly in the calculation of spikes. It is also a model that may be applied relatively easily, from a computational standpoint, with a good ratio between cost and efficiency. It remains a non-Markovian model, since the probability of a given neuronal spike depends on the accumulated activity of the system since the last spike.

Contributions to the model were made, considering the hydrodynamic limit of the interacting neuronal system, the long-range behavior and aspects pertaining to the process in the sense of predicting and classifying behaviors according to a fonction of parameters, and the generalization of the model to the continuous time.

The Galves–Löcherbach model was a cornerstone to the NeuroMat project.

See also 

Biological neuron model
Hodgkin–Huxley model
Computational neuroscience
NeuroMat

References 

Neural circuits
Computational neuroscience